This is a list of Colombian departments by gross domestic product in 2016.

2016 GDP by Departments

See also 
 Economy of Colombia

References

Source: Banco de la República 
http://www.banrep.gov.co/es/info-temas-a/4024 PIB total y por habitante
http://www.banrep.gov.co/es/poblacion
https://stats.oecd.org/

GDP
Departments by GDP
GDP, Colombian Departments
Gross state product
Colombia, GDP